Hibbertia glabriuscula is a species of flowering plant in the family Dilleniaceae and is endemic to the south-west of Western Australia. It is a small, erect shrub with thick, oblong leaves and yellow flowers borne singly on the ends of branchlets, with six to twelve stamens arranged around the two carpels.

Description
There are six to twelve stamens arranged around the two carpels, each carpel containing four to six ovules. Flowering has been observed in September.

Taxonomy
Hibbertia glabriuscula was first formally described in 1994 by Judy Wheeler in the journal Nuytsia from specimens she collected south of Carrabin in 1989. The specific epithet (glabriuscula) is the diminutive of the Latin word "glaber" meaning glabrous, referring to the absence of long hairs on the sepals and bracts, compared to those on the close relative H. drummondii.

Distribution and habitat
This hibbertia grows in sandy soil in heath and shrubland and has only been recorded near Carrabin in the Avon Wheatbelt and Mallee biogeographic regions of south-western Western Australia.

Conservation status
Hibbertia glabriuscula is classified as "Priority Three" by the Government of Western Australia Department of Parks and Wildlife meaning that it is poorly known and known from only a few locations but is not under imminent threat.

See also
List of Hibbertia species

References

glabriuscula
Flora of Western Australia
Plants described in 1994